The Thiruvempavai (Tamil: திருவெம்பாவை, IAST: Tiruvempāvai) is a collection of songs composed by the poet and saint, Manikkavacakar. It consists of 20 stanzas devoted to the Hindu God Shiva. It forms part of the collection called Thiruvasagam, and the 8th book of the Thirumurai, a canonical text of the Tamil Shaiva SiddhanTa. The songs form part of the Pavai ritual for unmarried young girls during the Tamil month of Margazhi.

Pavai genre 
The pavai songs are part of an ancient tradition amongst unmarried young girls, where they would light lamps in the early mornings of Margazhi, and sing songs in praise of Lord Shiva. The 20 stanzas are sung, one on every day and then followed by the 10 songs of the Thiruppalliyezhucchi. It is believed that such rituals would bring prosperity and a suitable husband.

Verses

References

Shaivism